Alan Peterson may refer to:

 Alan Peterson (director), American director of Fahrenhype 9/11
 Alan Peterson (meteorologist), Antarctic Automatic Weather Stations Project 1978
 Alan C. Peterson, actor appearing in films including Run and Spark

See also
 Allan Pettersson, Swedish composer